Dresden Township is an inactive township in Pettis County, in the U.S. state of Missouri.

Dresden Township was erected in 1873, and named after the community of Dresden, Missouri.

References

Townships in Missouri
Townships in Pettis County, Missouri